The 1988 Rutgers Scarlet Knights football team represented Rutgers University in the 1988 NCAA Division I-A football season. In their fifth season under head coach Dick Anderson, the Scarlet Knights compiled a 5–6 record while competing as an independent and outscored their opponents 273 to 255. They won games against two ranked opponents, Michigan State (17-13) and Penn State (21-16). The team's statistical leaders included Scott Erney with 2,123 passing yards, Mike Botti with 715 rushing yards, and Eric Young with 592 receiving yards.

Schedule

References

Rutgers
Rutgers Scarlet Knights football seasons
Rutgers Scarlet Knights football